Lugovi may refer to:

Places
Lugovi, Maglaj, a village without population in municipality of Maglaj, Bosnia and Herzegovina.
Lugovi, Pljevlja,  a hamlet in the municipality of Pljevlja, Montenegro.